The Bene Merito honorary distinction is a departmental (ministerial) decoration of Poland.  The Minister of Foreign Affairs of Poland awards the citizens of Poland and foreign nationals  with this decoration "in recognition of their merits in promoting Poland abroad."

In was established in 2009 by the then Minister of Foreign Affairs Radosław Sikorski.

References

Departmental decorations of Poland